{{Infobox boxing match
| fight date = March 21, 1997
| Fight Name = The Battle of the Undefeated
| location = Mark G. Etess Arena, Trump Taj Mahal, Atlantic City, New Jersey, US
| image = 
| fighter1 = Roy Jones Jr.
| nickname1 = Junior
| record1 = 34–0 (29 KO)
| height1 = 5 ft 11 in
| weight1 = 175 lb
| style1 = Orthodox
| hometown1 = Pensacola, Florida, US
| recognition1 = WBC light heavyweight champion[[The Ring (magazine)|The Ring]] No. 1 ranked pound-for-pound fighter3-division world champion
| fighter2 = Montell Griffin
| nickname2 = Ice
| record2 = 26–0 (18 KO)
| hometown2 = Chicago, Illinois, US
| height2 = 5 ft 7 in
| weight2 = 175 lb
| style2 = Orthodox
| recognition2 = WBU light heavyweight champion
| titles = WBC light heavyweight title
| result = Griffin wins via 9th-round disqualification
}}

Roy Jones Jr. vs. Montell Griffin, billed as The Battle of the Undefeated, was a professional boxing match contested on March 21, 1997 for the WBC light heavyweight championship.

Background
In his previous fight Roy Jones Jr. had captured the WBC light heavyweight championship after defeating Mike McCallum, making Jones a three-division world champion after previously winning titles in the middleweight and super middleweight divisions. For Jones' first defense, he was matched up against the undefeated Montell "Ice" Griffin, who in his previous fight had defeated James Toney for the second time to capture the less-regarded WBU light heavyweight title. Prior to the fight, Griffin was seen by some as possibly the greatest challenge Jones, who was ranked by The Ring'' magazine as the number-one pound-for-pound fighter in all of boxing, had faced in his professional career. Jones entered the fight as the overwhelming favorite, with the odds being as high as 17–1 in his favor, though they went down to 6–1 by the time of the fight.

The fight
Jones, who had rarely lost rounds on the scorecards, was taken to the limit by Griffin, who controlled the early portion of the fight. Jones eventually regained himself and by round nine, had taken a narrow lead on two of the judge's scorecards with scores of 77–75 and 76–75. The other judge, however, had Griffin ahead with a score of 76–75. In the ninth and final round, Griffin would dictate the pace for most of the first two minutes. But as the second minute came to a close, Jones staggered Griffin with a right hand. Jones then proceeded to attack Griffin in hopes of securing the knockout victory. Overwhelmed by Jones' flurry, Griffin took a knee with 45 seconds remaining in the round in an effort to avoid further punishment. However, Jones then landed a right–left combination, causing Griffin to slump forward and lay face-first on the canvas. Referee Tony Perez then proceeded to count Griffin  out and the fight was stopped at the 2:27 mark. Thinking he had picked up the knockout victory, Jones began to celebrate with his corner, but Perez then announced that he had disqualified Jones for the illegal blow, giving Jones his first professional loss and making Griffin the new WBC light heavyweight champion.

Aftermath
Jones' explained after the match that he "wasn't sure (Griffin) was down. I didn't have time to think and see whether he was down. I thought he was down and he might come back at me. I wasn't looking at his knees. I was looking at his face." Jones also put the blame on referee Tony Perez, saying "I didn't feel the ref try to separate me at all."  Perez reiterated that he began counting Griffin out because, he should've been able to continue, he would've only taken one or two point from Jones. However, when Griffin was unable to continue, Perez was left with no choice but to disqualify Jones for the foul.

Griffin initially talked of a unification match with then-WBA and IBF light heavyweight champion Virgil Hill, but he instead agreed to a rematch with Jones less than five months after their first fight on August 7, 1997.

References

1997 in boxing
Griffin 1
Boxing matches in Atlantic City, New Jersey
1997 in sports in New Jersey
March 1997 sports events in the United States